Landen is a railway station in the town of Landen, Flemish Brabant, Belgium. The station opened on 2 April 1838 and is located on lines 21 and 36. The train services are operated by National Railway Company of Belgium (NMBS).

Landen used to be located on 127 (to Statte) and 147 (to Tamines).

On 19 February 2016 a train ran away from a platform at Landen railway station after the driver left the cabin to inspect the train's mechanics. The train started moving in the direction of Tienen railway station and was stopped 30 minutes and 12 km later by a driver who jumped in the train's cab. No passengers were on the train during the incident.

Train services
The station is served by the following services:

Intercity services (IC-03) Blankenberge - Bruges - Ghent - Brussels - Leuven - Hasselt - Genk
Intercity services (IC-14) Quiévrain - Mons - Braine-le-Comte - Brussels - Leuven - Liege (weekdays)
Intercity services (IC-29) De Panne - Ghent - Aalst - Brussels - Brussels Airport - Leuven - Landen
Local services (L-21) Landen - Waremme - Liege (weekends)

References

External links
 
Railway stations in Belgium
Railway stations in Flemish Brabant
Railway stations in Belgium opened in 1838
Landen